Yusefabad (also Romanized as Yūsefābād) is a village in Eslamiyeh Rural District, in the Central District of Rafsanjan County, Kerman Province, Iran. At the 2006 census, its population was 178, in 50 families.

References 

Populated places in Rafsanjan County